Silke Rottenberg (born 25 January 1972) is a former German football goalkeeper.

Career
She last played for 1. FFC Frankfurt.  She announced her retirement from the German national team on 27 May 2008. After the game Germany versus Wales on 29 May 2008, she formally retired from international football. In 1998 she was selected German Female Footballer of the Year. Silke announced her retirement on 10 December 2008 from professional football.

Honours

Germany
 UEFA Women's Championship: Winner 1997, 2001, 2005
 FIFA Women's World Cup winner: 2003, 2007

Coaching career
Rottenberg works up 1 January 2009 as Goalkeeper Coach from Germany U-15 between Germany U-23 by German Football Association (DFB).

References

External links

 
 

1972 births
Living people
German women's footballers
Germany women's international footballers
1999 FIFA Women's World Cup players
2003 FIFA Women's World Cup players
2007 FIFA Women's World Cup players
FCR 2001 Duisburg players
Footballers at the 2000 Summer Olympics
Footballers at the 2004 Summer Olympics
Olympic bronze medalists for Germany
People from Euskirchen
Sportspeople from Cologne (region)
1. FFC Frankfurt players
Women's association football goalkeepers
FIFA Century Club
Olympic medalists in football
Medalists at the 2004 Summer Olympics
FIFA Women's World Cup-winning players
Medalists at the 2000 Summer Olympics
Olympic footballers of Germany
UEFA Women's Championship-winning players
Footballers from North Rhine-Westphalia